George Black may refer to:

George Black (Australian politician) (1854–1936), New South Wales politician
George Black (Canadian politician) (1873–1965), administrator and politician in Yukon, Canada
George Black (New Zealand politician) (1903–1932), New Zealand Member of Parliament for Motueka
George Black (RAF officer) (born 1932), British Royal Air Force pilot
George Black (shipbuilder) (1778–1854), Canadian shipbuilder
George Black (physician) (1854–1913), Scottish physician and writer
George Black (producer) (1890–1945), British theatrical impresario
George Fraser Black (1866–1948), Scottish-born American librarian, historian and linguist
George G. Black, founder of the Black Manufacturing Company of Seattle
George Montegu Black Sr. (1875–1959), grandfather of Conrad Black
George Montegu Black II (1911–1976), Canadian businessman and father of Conrad Black
George Robison Black (1835–1886), American politician and lawyer
George Ruddell Black (1865–1942), Lord Mayor of Belfast